Patsy McGarry is the Religious Affairs correspondent with The Irish Times. He succeeded Andy Pollak as editor in the mid-1990s. He also is the commissioning editor for articles which are published in the paper's Rite and Reason column every Monday. McGarry also writes occasionally on social issues for the newspaper. He has worked for Independent Newspapers, The Irish Press group, Magill magazine, and freelanced briefly for Raidió Teilifís Éireann.

Career
A native of Ballaghaderreen, County Roscommon, he is a graduate of University College Galway, and was auditor of the College's Literary and Debating Society in 1974-1975.

In 1989 he set up the first independent radio newsroom in the Republic at Capital Radio (now FM104) in Dublin, having previously worked for four years on the pirate station Sunshine Radio in the city.

He was theatre critic at The Irish Press from 1990 until 1995.  He received a national media award for comment and analysis in 1992 for Sunday Independent articles on the fall of Charles Haughey as Taoiseach and was awarded the 1998 Templeton European Religion Writer of the Year for articles in The Irish Times on Drumcree, the papal visit to Cuba that year, and articles criticising the Irish churches for failing to practise what they preached on reconciliation.

In 2001 he edited Christianity, a collection of essays published by Veritas.  A collection of weekly columns he wrote for The Irish Times in 2000 was published by that paper in 2001 under the title The Book of Jesus Report, a contemporary account of the four Gospels.

In 2006, Patsy wrote While Justice Slept: The True Story of Nicky Kelly and the Sallins Train Robbery. He also wrote the official biography of President Mary McAleese, entitled First Citizen: Mary McAleese and the Irish Presidency.

In February 2014 he was implicated by fellow Irish Times journalist John Waters as the author of a handful of ad hominem Tweets, written anonymously, that suggested a bias against Catholic social teaching.

He appears on TV3 occasionally.

References

External links
Articles by Patsy McGarry
 On the Message of Christmas (2004)
 Abuse compensation fund almost depleted, say bishops (2005)
Dowell rejects criticism of Asbos (2005)

Books by Patsy McGarry
Liffey Press product detail for While Justice Slept: The True Story of Nicky Kelly and the Sallins Train Robbery

Year of birth missing (living people)
Living people
Alumni of the University of Galway
FM104 presenters
Magill people
People from County Roscommon
The Irish Press people
The Irish Times people